Tommy Mason is a former association football player who represented New Zealand at international level.

Mason made his full New Zealand debut in a 0–1 loss to Israel on 3 March 1989 and ended his international playing career with four official A-international caps to his credit, his final cap an appearance in a 2–0 win over Taiwan on 20 March 1988.

After ending his playing career, Mason turned to football management and managed Football Kingz in the Australian National Soccer League for a short period.

References

External links

Living people
Papatoetoe AFC players
Farnborough F.C. players
New Zealand association footballers
New Zealand international footballers

1960 births
Association football defenders